Steinhausen-Rigiblick  is a railway station in the Swiss canton of Zug, situated in the municipality of Steinhausen. The station is located on the Zurich to Zug via Affoltern am Albis railway line.

The station was inaugurated on 26 November 2012 and opened on the timetable change on 9 December 2012. The construction of the 320-metre-long station cost about CHF 10.5 million. In addition to the construction of the platform and the underpass, the track was adapted for the S41 service, preserving the remains of the "Sumpfweiche" ("swamp points" at the former direct connection with the line to Luzerne).

Service 
The station is an intermediate stop on Zurich S-Bahn line S5.

 Zürich S-Bahn:

References 

Railway stations in the canton of Zug
Swiss Federal Railways stations
Railway stations in Switzerland opened in 2012